Ceroplesis marmorata is a species of beetle in the family Cerambycidae. It was described by Reiche in 1849. It is known from Ethiopia and Erythrea.

References

marmorata
Beetles described in 1849